Gladys Castelvecchi (November 26, 1922 in Rocha, Uruguay – May 28, 2008 in Montevideo) was an Uruguayan poet and literature professor. A member of the Generación del 45.

She moved to Flores after marrying writer, Mario Arregui.  Later on she returned to Montevideo where she taught at public high schools.  During the Uruguayan dictatorship period she was stripped of her teaching degree and imprisoned.
She published several poems and articles that were published in weekly Uruguayan magazines.

References

1922 births
2008 deaths
People from Rocha, Uruguay
Uruguayan people of Italian descent
Uruguayan women poets
People from Montevideo
Uruguayan educators
20th-century Uruguayan poets
20th-century Uruguayan women writers